The 20th Annual Nickelodeon Kids' Choice Awards was held on March 31, 2007, hosted by Justin Timberlake. The show was held at Pauley Pavilion at the University of California, Los Angeles. Gwen Stefani (with Akon) and Maroon 5 performed during the show.

Online voting began on March 5, 2007. A "Name That Nominee" special hosted by Lil' JJ aired on March 11. Another special called "Deep Inside the KCAs" (hosted by Emma Roberts) aired on March 18.

Musical Guests
Countdown to Kids' Choice:
 Drake Bell: "Hollywood Girl"

The Show:
 Maroon 5: "Makes Me Wonder"
 Gwen Stefani featuring Akon: "The Sweet Escape"

Presenters
Favorite Movie Actress:
 Will Ferrell, Jon Heder, Emma Roberts
Favorite Music Group:
 Nat Wolff, Alex Wolff, Hilary Duff
Special Bungee Jumping Slime World Record:
 Ryan Seacrest
Favorite TV Show:
 Ice Cube, Ty Pennington
Favorite Voice From an Animated Movie:
 Jessica Alba, Chris Evans
Maroon 5:
 Chris Brown, Jamie Lynn Spears
Favorite TV Actor:
 Hayden Panettiere, Masi Oka
Wannabe Award:
 Jack Black
Favorite Animated Movie:
 Steve Carell, Tobey Maguire
Favorite Movie Actor:
 Shia LaBeouf, Mandy Moore
Kids' Choice Burp Contest:
 Kenan Thompson
Favorite Male Singer:
 George Lopez, Tyler James Williams, Bindi Irwin
Gwen Stefani feat. Akon:
 Ryan Sheckler, Nelly
Favorite Movie:
 Queen Latifah, Zac Efron
Unpresented Winners:
 Devon Werkheiser, Lil' JJ, Rihanna
Options for Breaking the Slime Barrier:
 Jesse McCartney, Ciara

Winners and nominees
Winners are listed first, in bold. Other nominees are in alphabetical order.

Movies

Television

Music

Miscellaneous

Wannabe Award
 Ben Stiller

Slimed Celebrities
 Justin Timberlake
 Jackie Chan
 Chris Tucker
 Mandy Moore
 Tobey Maguire
 Steve Carell
 Nicole Kidman
 Vince Vaughn

References

External links 
 
 Official 2007 Kids' Choice Awards website

Nickelodeon Kids' Choice Awards
Kids' Choice Awards
Kids' Choice Awards
Kids' Choice Awards
2007 in Los Angeles
Nick